Abdulaziz Al-Anberi, also spelled Abdul-Aziz Al-Anbari (born 3 January 1954 in Kaifan) is a Kuwaiti footballer.

Career
Al-Anberi began his sporting career as a basketball and volleyball player. However, in 1976, he decided to focus on football, his favourite sport. He began playing for Kuwait SC as a youth player and until he was promoted to the first team.

He was included in the Kuwait squad that won the 1980 AFC Asian Cup and the squad that qualified to the 1982 World Cup.

References

1954 births
Kuwaiti footballers
1976 AFC Asian Cup players
1980 AFC Asian Cup players
1982 FIFA World Cup players
AFC Asian Cup-winning players
Living people
Asian Games medalists in football
Footballers at the 1982 Asian Games
Asian Games silver medalists for Kuwait

Association football forwards
Medalists at the 1982 Asian Games
Kuwait SC players
Kuwait international footballers
Kuwait Premier League players